Arnautović is a Serbo-Croatian surname. It derives from Arnaut, the Ottoman Turkish ethnonym for Albanians. At least 254 individuals with the surname died at the Jasenovac concentration camp. It may refer to:

 Ilija Arnautović (1924–2009), Yugoslav and Serbian architect
 Marko Arnautović (born 1989), Austrian football player
 Nemanja Arnautović (born 1990), Serbian basketball player
 Tijana Arnautović (born 1986), Miss World Canada 2004
 Zlatan Arnautović (born 1956), Yugoslav handball player

See also 
Arnautoff, surname of the same origin in Russian
Arnautovići

References

Serbian surnames
Bosnian surnames